José Antônio Moreira Filho, the second baron with grandee of Ipanema (27 August 1830 — 27 February 1899), was a Brazilian businessman in real estate. He was a partner of José Luís Guimarães Caipora.

He was the son of José Antônio Moreira, first baron, viscount and count with grandee of Ipanema, and of Laurinda Rosa Ferreira dos Santos. He married Luísa Rudge. They left many descendants, from which marriage they bore the compound surname Ipanema Moreira.

He was made Commander of the Portuguese Military Order of Christ and of the Order of Our Lady of the Conception of Vila Vicosa. He received his baronage by decree on 13 May 1885, and the grandeeship by decree on 5 September 1888. His title referenced the Rio Ipanema, on whose banks his father had built the Ipanema Ironworks, in Sorocaba. Subsequently, Moreira settled down in the city of Rio de Janeiro, where he was a leader in the urbanization of the Town of Ipanema, today's district of Ipanema.

References

19th-century Brazilian people
Brazilian nobility
1830 births
1899 deaths
Commanders of the Order of the Immaculate Conception of Vila Viçosa
Commanders of the Order of Christ (Portugal)